WWBK-LP was a television station located in the Richmond, Virginia television market, broadcasting on channel 39. It was owned by King Forward, Inc.

History
The station signed on in 2002 as W39CO by Trinity Christian Center of Santa Ana, Inc. as an owned-and-operated TBN affiliate.

On April 13, 2010, TBN took W39CO silent due to declining support, which has been attributed to the digital transition. W39CO returned to the air on June 5, 2010. On April 13, 2012, TBN sold 36 of its translators, including W39CO, to Regal Media, a broadcasting group headed by George Cooney, the CEO of the EUE/Screen Gems studios. In the meantime, W39CO left the air once more, on July 12, 2012, after losing the lease to its transmitter site; the station didn't return to the airwaves after the sale to Regal Media was completed.

The station was then acquired by King Forward, Inc. in early 2014.

On June 3, 2014, the station's callsign was changed to WWBK-LP.

The station's license was cancelled by the FCC on November 18, 2015.

Digital television
In May 2006, the FCC granted National Minority TV (a former TBN subsidiary that owned the station at the time)'s request for  permission to digital flash-cut (end analog transmission and immediately began digital transmission on the same channel) the low-power analog translator for the station.  The FCC gave the station until May 12, 2009 to complete the flash cut.  The station has not begun digital broadcasting and continued to transmit an analog signal until going silent.

References

External links

WBK-LP
Television channels and stations established in 2002
2002 establishments in Virginia
Defunct television stations in the United States
Television channels and stations disestablished in 2015
2015 disestablishments in Virginia